Gordon Reid defeated Joachim Gérard in the final, 7–6(9–7), 6–4 to win the men's singles wheelchair tennis title at the 2016 Australian Open.

Shingo Kunieda was the three-time defending champion, but was defeated in the quarterfinals by Reid.

Seeds

Draw

References 

General

 Drawsheets on ausopen.com 

Specific

Wheelchair Men's Singles
2016 Men's Singles